Arcis may refer to:

Larcis, or Arcis, a river in southwestern France
Arcis-sur-Aube, a commune in the Grand Est region in north-central France
Canton of Arcis-sur-Aube
Arcis-le-Ponsart, a commune in the Marne department in northeastern France
University ARCIS, a private university in Chile
Marc Arcis (1655–1739), a French sculptor

See also

ARCI (disambiguation)